Piquemal is a French surname. Notable people with the surname include:

 Christian Piquemal (born 1940), French military officer
 Claude Piquemal (born 1939), French athlete
 François Piquemal, French politician and educator
 Michel Piquemal (born 1947), French conductor

French-language surnames